The chestnut-bellied monarch (Monarcha castaneiventris) or chestnut-bellied monarch-flycatcher is a species of bird in the family Monarchidae.  It is endemic to the Solomon Islands.

Subspecies
Four subspecies are recognized:
 M. c. castaneiventris - Verreaux, 1858: Found on Choiseul, Santa Isabel, Guadalcanal and Malaita
 M. c. obscurior - Mayr, 1935: Found on Russell Islands
 Makira monarch (M. c. megarhynchus) - Rothschild & Hartert, 1908: Found on Makira 
 Makira monarch (M. c. ugiensis) - (Ramsay, EP, 1882): Originally described as a separate species in the genus Pomarea. Found on Ugi Island

Behaviour and ecology
In 2009, it was reported that a genetic change in some members of this species caused their colouration and songs to be different from other members of the species.  As a result, members in one group did not recognize members in the other, so the two groups became reproductively isolated from each other. It was thought that over time, this could eventually lead to the creation of a new species, and that this was an example of biological evolution.

References

chestnut-bellied monarch
Endemic birds of the Solomon Islands
chestnut-bellied monarch
Taxonomy articles created by Polbot